Gyimah is a surname. Notable people with the surname include:

Dorcas Gyimah (born 1992), Ghanaian sprinter
Sam Gyimah (born 1976), English politician
Prince Gyimah (born 1990), Ghanaian footballer
 Alexander Jeffrey Obiri Asamoah Gyimah (or Alex Asamoah) (born 1986), Ghanaian footballer
Ghanaian surnames